The Cross of Merit for Women and Girls (Ehrenkreuz für Frauen und Jungfrauen) was created on 22 March 1871 by Kaiser Wilhelm I, German Emperor, in his capacity as King of Prussia. The award was presented only to women, but was not a Ladies Order in the most narrow sense. Women and girls were awarded at the request of Empress Augusta, and the award was bestowed by the Kaiser.

Description of the award
The appearance and shape is very similar to the Iron Cross, but on the obverse at the junction of the arms is an emblem of the Red cross. On the reverse there is the royal crown above the intertwined monograms "A" and "W" and the date of 1870–1871. The cross was worn from suspended by a bow on the left chest. The ribbon is the same as that of the Iron Cross for Non-combatants, white with black stripes at the edge.

Recipients 
26 June 1871: Princess Louis of Hesse and by Rhine

1871: Countess Hedwig von Rittberg

References
 Maximilian Gritzner: Handbuch der Ritter- und Verdienstorden aller Kulturstaaten der Welt. Weber, Leipzig 1893 (Nachdruck: Reprint-Verlag Leipzig, Holzminden 2000).

Orders of chivalry for women
Orders of chivalry of Germany
Kingdom of Prussia
Orders, decorations, and medals of Prussia
1871 establishments in Germany
Awards established in 1871
Awards honoring women